This is a list of electricity-generating power stations in the U.S. state of Connecticut, sorted by type and name.  In 2020, Connecticut had a total summer capacity of 10,276 MW through all of its power plants, and a net generation of 41,191 GWh.  The corresponding electrical energy generation mix in 2021 was 55.6% natural gas, 39% nuclear, 2.1% other, 1.9% biomass & refuse-derived fuels , 0.7% hydroelectric, and 0.7% solar. The remaining 0.1% was split between petroleum and wind. Distributed small-scale solar, including customer-owned photovoltaic panels, delivered an additional net 860 GWh to the state's electricity grid. This compares as more than three times the amount generated by Connecticut's utility-scale solar facilities.

Nuclear power stations

Retired plants:
 Connecticut Yankee Nuclear Power Plant: 560 MW, operated 1968-1996

Fossil-fuel power stations

Coal
https://www.power-eng.com/coal/pseg-exits-coal-fired-power-with-bridgeport-harbor-station-retirement/

Petroleum

 Multi-fuel plant, listed is "Total Net Summer Capacity" by source.
 Not to be confused with the historic Cos Cob Power Station

Natural gas

 Multi-fuel plant, listed is "Total Net Summer Capacity" by source.

Renewable power stations

Biomass and refuse-derived fuels

Geothermal
There were no utility-scale Geothermal facilities in the state of Connecticut in 2019.

Hydroelectric

 Multi-fuel plant, listed is "Total Net Summer Capacity" by source.

Solar

 Multi-fuel plant, listed is "Total Net Summer Capacity" by source.

Wind

Storage power stations

Battery storage
There were no utility-scale Battery Storage facilities in the state of Connecticut in 2019.

Pumped storage

See also 
 List of power stations in the United States
 List of wind farms in the United States

References

Connecticut
 
Lists of buildings and structures in Connecticut
Energy in Connecticut